This is a list of prisons within Liaoning province of the People's Republic of China.

Sources 

Buildings and structures in Liaoning
Liaoning